is a fictional character from the Spike Chunsoft visual novel action-adventure game series Danganronpa. She was introduced in the 2010 game Danganronpa: Trigger Happy Havoc as a high school student and "Ultimate ???" of Hope's Peak Academy sealed within the building, who upon being told by a robot named Monokuma that one of the other students present must become "the blackened" and kill another without being found out by the other students if they wish to leave; by the end of the game, Kyoko is found to be the "Ultimate Detective". Despite being initially distant to the cast, Kyoko befriends Makoto Naegi as both join forces to solve class trials to find the identity of the killers. Kyoko reappears in other Danganronpa titles and sequels facing new cases involving Monokuma, most notably the 2016 anime series Danganronpa 3: The End of Hope's Peak High School and the spin-off video game Kirigiri Sou as a supporting character, as well in the series of prequel light novels Danganronpa: Kirigiri (2013–2020), which center on her childhood and rise through the Detective Shelf Collection (DSC), as she deals with new cases with her assistant Yui Samidare.

Kyoko was created by the writer Kazutaka Kodaka. Kodaka wanted to have a detective character in the first game who would support Makoto in solving cases. Their bond was intended to be initially friendly before taking a romantic shift in The End of Hope's Peak High School. This was Kodaka's way of showing a notable character arc; from a cold distant teenager to a caring young adult. Designer Rui Komatsuzaki expressed difficulties in creating Kyoko, as the game required a mysterious girl with feminine traits to replace Sayaka Maizono, another character initially presented the first game's heroine. While Yōko Hikasa is Kyoko's sole Japanese voice actress, the character has had two actresses in English: Erika Harlacher in the games and Caitlin Glass in the anime adaptations.

Critical response to Kyoko has been positive. Multiple writers enjoyed her role in the first video game due to how she solves cases alongside Makoto while also developing the narrative. Her return to the anime was also the subject of praise but her fate was mixed based on the impact it brought to the story. Nevertheless, Kyoko remained as one of the most popular Danganronpa characters, appearing in multiple polls. The performance of Kyoko's three voice actresses also attracted a positive response.

Creation

In later parts of development of the games, the characters of Leon Kuwata and Sayaka Maizono were both used to establish a base body type and height. The developers from Spike both used as stand-ins during many stages of development, and their character designs are very recognizable as early as the scrapped project DISTRUST. Due to the staff dissatisfied with their designs, the development team at Spike grew tired of them and so they were the first characters to be killed in the final published game, with Kyoko replacing Sayaka in the process. The concept behind Kyoko's traits originated from Kodaka's desire to add a detective to the first Danganronpa game. Although Kyoko interacts with the main character, Makoto Naegi, multiple times, Kodaka claimed he never wrote the latter to be the former's love interest. Instead, the interactions between Makoto and his supporting characters were created due to the latter's skills as a detective which would help the player at solving cases. 
In order to balance the cast, Kodaka conceived the idea of giving the students loose parts of their past. As a result, Kyoko does not stand out in the narrative due to her lack of detective skills resulting in the multiple collaborations the two teenagers make when solving murder cases.

Although artist Rui Komatsuzaki made Kyoko, Kodaka was responsible for most of the elements from Kyoko's appearance. Kodaka aimed the design of Kyoko to indicate hints that she is a detective resulting in the inclusion of hints through her clothing, including her black gloves and her black jacket.

Komatsuzaki has claimed that Kyoko was one of the most difficult female characters to create in the first game of the franchise. It was decided by the staff that Kyoko would be developed from the idea of a "mysterious girl". This originally resulted in her having planned to have a toneless, monotone color scheme. The design had to be altered after the game's direction changed to the "Psycho Pop" art style involving a lighter style than the original ideas which were not accepted by the publisher behind the game. The color scheme was changed to a pastel purple. Her early design prominently featured a school uniform with overalls because Komatsuzaki wanted it to have a rarer design than the other female characters, but this was later changed to a blouse and skirt. Komatsusaki had difficulties deciding which hairstyle to choose for Kyoko and was torn between a shorter style or a longer one. It was suggested by producer Yoshinori Terasawa that Kyoko could have a symbolic hair cutting scene in the first game, but the idea was ultimately rejected and so Kyoko's hair remained long. Because Kyoko is a replacement after Sayaka's death, Komatsuzaki wanted Kyoko's design to closely parallel Sayaka's, and their similar hairstyles in different shades was a deliberate choice.

Development and casting

In contrast to her cold personality from the first game, Kodaka envisioned Kyoko in the anime sequel as more considerate of her friends. While other returning characters like Aoi Asahina and Byakuya Togami show a more caring side in the anime too, Kyoko's personality was Kodaka's favorite. Furthermore, in contrast to the first game, Kyoko's relationship with Makoto in Danganronpa 3: The End of Hope's Peak High School was written to implicate a more intimate tone than in the original game. Kodaka carefully planned this through a scene where Kyoko takes off her gloves for the first time in the series in order to comfort Makoto. This was also meant to provide a parallel between the romantic relationship between two other characters from the same series, Kyosuke Munakata and Chisa Yukizome who are also implied to be involved romantically. Makoto's voice actor, Megumi Ogata said she found the anime too dark not only for the gruesome moments but also because of Kyoko's apparent death which has a parallel with Chiaki Nanami's death from the Despair Arc.

Following the visual novel prequel centered around Kyoko, Kirigiri Sou, writer Kitayama Takekuni was selected as the lead much to his surprise. Takenkuni admitted that Kyoko was his favorite character from the franchise and thus aimed to write her story with the idea that the title character would stand out cool, believing Kodaka does the opposite to the cast in his works. This also led to the inclusion of sidekick characters who would come across as less appealing than Kyoko in the process. However, Shikiba Santa was selected as a character who does activities other than Kyoko. Some scenes from the game like Kyoko's appearing in the main character's car were a homage to the game Otogirisō, a 2002  Chunsoft visual novel, but slightly modified to give a more realistic scenario.

In all of her appearances in Japan, Kyoko is voiced by Yōko Hikasa. The actress commented she grew to like playing the game and thus enjoyed her new works in the first anime. When asked about her role, Hikasa found Kyoko mysterious and cool, but felt she was too distanced from the rest of the other characters explored in her debut. Erika Harlacher did the English acting. She described Kyoko as the calmest among the wacky characters and always on top of things. Although Harlacher did not reprise her role for the anime adaptations, the actress remained in touch with her replacement, Caitlin Glass. Glass enjoyed Kyoko's characterization in the anime due to how supportive she is to Makoto despite believing she will not survive the next time the cast falls asleep. She felt the scene touching and at the same time felt shocked about such a twist. However, she felt that Kyoko's revelation of her survival shocked in the finale and wanted to use her last line as a way to say goodbye to the character. A stage play based on the anime was made with Natsume Okamoto expressing joy about her role as Kyoko.

Appearances

Danganronpa video games
Kyoko Kirigiri is introduced in the video game Danganronpa: Trigger Happy Havoc as a mysterious woman trapped in the school Hope's Peak Academy. The main character, Makoto Naegi, is confused when meeting her as all students summoned by the academy stand out within society but he has never information surrounding her. The entire group is told by the robot Monokuma to kill each other if they wish freedom, resulting in a series of murders and trials to find the culprit to survive. Kyoko learns that the first victim was Makoto's childhood friend Sayaka Maizono the two become partners when trying to comfort him when learning of Sayaka's last actions. Kyoko and Makoto join forces on multiple occasions and in the class trials. After exposing the suicide of Sakura Ogami, Kyoko learns there is a secret student named Mukuro Ikusaba and disappears during the investigation of her death. Kyoko's disappearance causes her to be suspected of Mukuro's eventual death. This causes the player to either expose Kyoko and kill her, ending the video game. If Makoto chooses to protect Kyoko, Makoto is instead blamed for Mukuro's death. As an artificial intelligence manages to save Makoto from Monokuma, Kyoko goes to the bottom area of the academy to save him. Kyoko recalls she is the daughter of Hope's Peak Academy's headmaster, Jin Kirigiri, but detests her late father. Confronting Monokuma again, Kyoko and Makoto expose the robot as the true mastermind behind Mukuro's death and the academy, Junko Enoshima. Junko reveals her own identity and reveals a major tragedy that caused the amnesia within the school to protect them from the real world. Junko offers protection once again to the few survivors but Makoto convinces his classmates not to give up hope, convincing Junko to concede and allow herself to be executed, deactivating the school's air filtration system and forcing Kyoko and the survivors to leave and face the ruined world.

During the climax of Danganronpa 2: Goodbye Despair, Kyoko joins Makoto and Byakuya in confronting Junko's Alter Ego and stop the main characters from bringing about Junko's physical resurrection. It is revealed that the cast members from Goodbye Despair are the Ultimate Despair terrorist leadership, the Remnants of Despair, whom Kyoko and company had prevented from being executed by the Future Foundation (a paramilitary "Hope" group they themselves had joined shortly after leaving Hope's Peak Academy) upon their capture in order to attempt to rewrite their memories to their cause after sealing them in a virtual world. Hajime Hinata convinces the other Remnants into killing themselves again to stop his (as Izuru Kamukura) and Junko's plans, freeing Kyoko, Makoto and Byakuya and allowing them to return to the real world. Beating the game unlocks the novel Danganronpa: Trigger Happy Havoc IF, an alternate version of the first game. There, Kyoko meets Mukuro as Makoto prevents her death from Junko. Despite initially suspecting Mukuro for being allied with Junko, Kyoko agrees to help her to protect the wounded Makoto, eventually leading to the Killing Game's cancellation and all the students leaving the Academy in the process.

During the climax of Danganronpa V3: Killing Harmony, Kyoko's persona is taken on by the new mastermind to reveal the truth of the world of Danganronpa, with her character being praised by "the people of the outside world."

Kyoko also appears in the visual novel Kirigiri Sou where she investigates a seemingly abandoned mansion in the woods with Kouhei Matsudaira, encountering her apparent duplicate. Kyoko is also present in the action video game Danganronpa: Unlimited Battle, and the virtual reality tech demo Cyber Danganronpa VR: The Class Trial. She has also been a guest alongside Identity V as crossover collaboration in a doll design, as well as in Guns Girl Z in her anime design where the two companions flirt with each other.

Danganronpa printed media

Kyoko appears in the light novel Danganronpa/Zero where she investigates the terrorist attacks known as the Tragedy before having her memory erased. While searching Junko, Kyoko also searches for her ally Izuru Kamukura who is later revealed to be Hajime Hinata in Goodbye Despair. She later investigates the amnesiac girl Ryoko, who is later revealed as Junko herself.

She is the title character of the spin-off novel series Danganronpa: Kirigiri, where she, along with her friend and assistant Yui Samidare, becomes involved in a deadly game in an abandoned hotel. Kyoko reprises her role from the first game in a manga adaptation written by Hajime Tōya and Takashi Tsukimi. She is also present in a series of comedy shorts based on The End of Hope's Peak High School.

In the manga series Killer Killer, Kyoko appears as a superior of Future Foundation agents Misaki Asano and Takumi Hijirihara investigating the titular "Killer Killer", questioning Takumi over his former association to her suspect of being the serial killer, his former classmate and Mukuro Ikusaba survivor Shūji Fujigawa, while remaining unaware that Takumi himself is the true Killer Killer, information of which her own superiors are aware, to her lack of knowledge.

Danganronpa anime

Kyoko appears as a protagonist of the 2013 anime Danganronpa: The Animation, adapting Danganronpa: Trigger Happy Havoc.

In the 2016 anime Danganronpa 3: The End of Hope's Peak High School, Kyoko and Aoi Asahina escort Makoto to the Future Foundation whose vice-chairman Kyosuke Munakata places him under arrest for protecting the members of the Remnants of Despair in Goodbye Despair. However, this is interrupted by a Monokuma Hunter game alongside other Future Foundation members. Every player is given a forbidden action that would instantly kill them through poison. Kyoko is split from her allies but is supported by Future Foundation member Koichi Kizakura who keeps in secret that he promised Jin Kirigiri to protect Kyoko. After Kizakura sacrifices her life to save Kyoko, she keeps investigating the victims. She reunites with Makoto whom she comforts when her friend starts doubting how he can stop Monokuma. Shortly afterward, Kyoko is presumably killed by the poison in her wristband as a result of her forbidden action, "passing the fourth time limit with Makoto still alive." Despite his shock triggering Kyoko's death, Makoto realizes that Kyoko was prepared for her death and that her last wish was that he would never lose the hope he gave her in the original game. After stopping Munakata, Makoto learns of Kyoko's works involving the investigation of the dead bodies and learns through her notes the modus operandi to end the killing game. At the end of the series, it is revealed she had survived thanks to an antidote created by one of the Remnants of Despair, which slowed the poison's effects and put her in a coma until Mikan revived her. She then becomes a teacher at the New Hope's Peak Academy welcoming Makoto as the headmaster from the rebuilt building.

Reception
Critical reception to Kyoko has been positive. The Gamer listed her as the third best Danganronpa character after Makoto and Monokuma based on the mystery she initially provides in the narrative such as why she always wears gloves. In two 2013 polls from Anime Trend, Kyoko was voted as the best female character of the year based on her appearances in Danganronpa: The Animation. In a popularity poll from the franchise for the collected release of Trigger Happy Havoc and Goodbye Despair, Kyoko took the fourth spot. To celebrate, Rui Komatsuzaki did an illustration of the top five to be featured in the re-release of the games, Reload. In a Danganronpa: The Animation poll, Kyoko took fourth place. In December 2020, Japanese fashion brand Estryllia Enhillia announced a clothing line featuring a range of dresses, accessories, and unisex clothing pieces themed around Danganronpa characters to tie in with the 10th anniversary of Danganronpa: Trigger Happy Havoc, including Toko Fukawa, Byakuya Togami, Makoto, Junko Enoshima, Monokuma and Kyoko. In a 2021 poll, Kyoko was voted as the fifth best Danganronpa character.

Manga News praised Kyoko's characterization in the Danganronpa: The Animation manga as, despite starting as a cold stoic character, she opens up to Makoto during their team up to investigate the class' trials presented through the narrative. The inclusion of her backstory during the climax was also the subject of praise. Her role in Danganronpa/Zero was also well received by Kotaku for how she interacts with the main character. Comic Book Resources listed the second most intelligent character behind Izuru Kamukura, citing her popularity in the series and how she often solves cases with Makoto. Remembering the release of the first Danganronpa anime, Kodaka learned of a fan who was overjoyed by just seeing two characters promoted. In response, he believes that the characters must have been Makoto and Kyoko based on their popularity.

In regards to her role in the anime, The Fandom Post listed her as one of the most beautiful characters from Summer 2016, claiming she retained her charm from the video games despite having little screentime in the anime. Both Anime News Network and Manga Tokyo praised Kyoko's role in the anime as due to her detective work with latter comparing her Sherlock Holmes. However, the fact that her forbidden action that would kill would be having Makoto live across multiple blackouts in the Killing Game was criticized by the writer forcing her suicide to bring pain to Makoto, who finds himself guilty as a result of being the reason she had to die. On the other hand, Anime News Network praised how, despite being aware of her imminent death, Kyoko determined to comfort and assist Makoto regardless of her sacrifice. The Fandom Post was shocked by Kyoko's apparent death in the anime, finding Kizakura's sacrifice to save her in a recent episode be in vain, especially due to how the latter's character has been begged by the former's father to protect his daughter. Nevertheless, he found the anime did pay a tribute to Kyoko's role in the original game and how he bonded Makoto when they were trapped in the school through a flashback which was popular within the fandom for making Kyoko look comical despite her stoic demeanor following the game's fifth trial. Despite the shock of her apparent death, Manga Tokyo felt that Kyoko's work in previous episodes in the form of analyzing the anime's dead bodies is still impactful as Makoto is given hints in how to solve the Killing Game the anime follows. Manga Tokyo was delighted with the fact that Kyoko actually survives in the series finale due to the negative impact her apparent death brought to Makoto during his encounter with Kyosuke Munakata. Anime News Network compared the tragic relationship between Makoto and Kyoko to Romeo and Juliet, but criticized the latter's survival in the finale as it removed the drama the anime built ever since her apparent death.

The voice actress behind the character has been popular. Erika Harlacher's work was cited as passable by video game writers. Caitlin Glass's performance as Kyoko's English voice for the first anime and the sequel were found by Anime News Network writer Theron Martin and James Beckett as one of the best portrayals within the Funimation English dub but felt that she was overshadowed by Bryce Papenbrook's work as Makoto. Kyoko was also voted as the 8th best and 5th Yōko Hikasa characters in two polls by AnimeAnime. THEM Anime Reviews referred to Hikasa as one of the best Japanese actors featured in the anime series.

References

Danganronpa characters
Fictional private investigators
Female characters in anime and manga
Female characters in video games
Fictional Japanese people in video games
Video game characters introduced in 2010
Orphan characters in video games